Shanice Janice van de Sanden (born 2 October 1992) is a Dutch professional footballer who plays as a forward for Women's Super League club Liverpool and the Netherlands national team.

Club career
Her career started at amateur club VVIJ in IJsselstein, before moving to FC Utrecht in 2008 where she also played for its farm team SV Saestum.

In May 2010, she moved to SC Heerenveen, where she played for one season before joining FC Twente in May 2011.

After four and a half seasons at FC Twente, she signed with Liverpool of the English WSL1 on 4 February 2016.

On 29 August 2017, after two seasons at Liverpool where she played a total of 28 matches (in all competitions), she moved to France and joined Division 1 Féminine club Olympique Lyonnais.

In September 2020 it was announced that Van de Sanden would be moving to Germany to play for Wolfsburg with immediate effect.

On 16 July 2022, Van de Sanden rejoined Liverpool.

International career
Aged 16, she made her debut for the senior Netherlands women's national football team on 14 December 2008 in a friendly match 2–0 win over France. She was part of the Dutch squad in the UEFA Women's Euro 2009 and the 2015 FIFA Women's World Cup.

In June 2017, she was in the 23 players squad which won the UEFA Women's Euro 2017. Later that year, she was shortlisted for the UEFA Women's Player of the Year Award.

Van de Sanden was selected in the final squad for the 2019 FIFA Women's World Cup in France.

International goals
Scores and results list the Netherlands goal tally first.

Honours

Club
FC Utrecht
 KNVB Women's Cup (1): 2009–10

FC Twente
 BeNe League (2): 2012–13, 2013–14
 Eredivisie (4): 2012–13*, 2013–14*, 2014–15*, 2015–16
 KNVB Women's Cup (1): 2014–15
*During the BeNe League period (2012 to 2015), the highest placed Dutch team is considered as national champion by the Royal Dutch Football Association.

Lyon
 Division 1 Féminine (3): 2017–18, 2018–19, 2019–20
 Coupe de France Féminine (2): 2018–19, 2019–20
 UEFA Women's Champions League (3): 2017–18, 2018–19, 2019–20

International
Netherlands
UEFA Women's Euro (1): 2017
Algarve Cup: 2018

We Play Strong
Van de Sanden is one of UEFA's official ambassadors for #WePlayStrong, a social media and vlogging campaign which was launched in 2018.  The campaign's  "...aim is to promote women’s football as much as we can and to make people aware of women’s football, really,” Evans, another participant explains. “The ultimate goal is to make football the most played sport by females by 2020. So it’s a UEFA initiative to get more women and girls playing football, whether they want to be professional or not.”  The series, which also originally included professional footballers Sarah Zadrazil, Eunice Beckmann, Laura Feiersinger and Lisa Evans and now also includes Petronella Ekroth and Shanice van de Sanden, follows the daily lives of female professional footballers.

Personal life
As of August 2020, Van de Sanden has a girlfriend.

References

External links

 
 
 Profile   at vrouwenvoetbalnederland.nl
Senior national team profile at Onsoranje.nl (in Dutch)
Under-19 national team profile at Onsoranje.nl (in Dutch)
Under-17 national team profile at Onsoranje.nl (in Dutch)

1992 births
Living people
Footballers from Utrecht (city)
Dutch sportspeople of Surinamese descent
Dutch women's footballers
Netherlands women's international footballers
Dutch expatriate sportspeople in Germany
Dutch expatriate sportspeople in England
Dutch expatriate sportspeople in France
Expatriate women's footballers in England
Expatriate women's footballers in France
Eredivisie (women) players
Women's Super League players
Division 1 Féminine players
FC Utrecht (women) players
SC Heerenveen (women) players
FC Twente (women) players
Liverpool F.C. Women players
Olympique Lyonnais Féminin players
Women's association football forwards
2015 FIFA Women's World Cup players
UEFA Women's Championship-winning players
Knights of the Order of Orange-Nassau
2019 FIFA Women's World Cup players
Dutch expatriate women's footballers
LGBT association football players
Dutch LGBT sportspeople
SV Saestum players
Footballers at the 2020 Summer Olympics
Olympic footballers of the Netherlands
VfL Wolfsburg (women) players
Frauen-Bundesliga players
Expatriate women's footballers in Germany
UEFA Women's Euro 2017 players